During the 1996–97 English football season, Manchester City F.C. competed in the Football League First Division.

Team kit

Season summary
Alan Ball was sacked soon after Manchester City's 1996–97 Division One campaign got underway. Despite decent form under caretaker manager Asa Hartford, the board opted to appoint former Crystal Palace manager Steve Coppell as Ball's successor, only for him to resign after just 6 matches in charge and 33 days as manager, claiming that the job was too much pressure for him. Phil Neal took over on a caretaker basis for 10 games; however he lost 7 of these and by Christmas, City were in the bottom half of Division One and had turned to former Nottingham Forest manager Frank Clark to arrest the decline. Manchester City finished 14th in the final table.

Final league table

Results summary

Results
Manchester City's score comes first

Legend

Football League First Division

FA Cup

League Cup

Squad

References

Manchester City F.C. seasons
Manchester City